The Peace Tree is a 2005 family film written and directed by Canadian filmmaker Mitra Sen.

Plot
The Peace Tree tells the story of two little girls, one Muslim and one Christian, who dream of celebrating each other's festivals, Eid and Christmas.  But when they share their dreams, they are met with resistance from their parents who express their concerns. Through their struggles, they create a unique symbol—The Peace Tree, a tree that highlights the symbols from all our cultures and faiths to reflect the beauty of "diversity in unity". The Peace Tree shares the voices of the children who try to enlighten their parents to the importance of sharing and celebrating diversity together.

Production
The film was written and directed by Mitra Sen, and produced by Sandalwood Productions in association with Harmony Movement and CBC.

Release
The Peace Tree was screened at over 50 film festivals, including Tribeca Film Festival, and received twelve international awards.

Impact
The film triggered the creation of Peace Trees internationally, and the proclamation of Peace Tree Day on June 1, 2006, by Mayor David Miller in Toronto. In 2007, York Region, York Regional Police, York Region District School Board and the City of Windsor proclaimed Peace Tree Day.

Awards and recognition
Liv Ullmann Peace Prize, 22nd Chicago International Film Festival
Children's Film Festival for promoting peace and harmony
Audience Award, Taiwan International Children's Film and Television Film Festival 2006
Nominated Best Feature, Taiwan International Children's Film and Television Festival 2006
Silver Cairo for Short Film, Cairo International Film Festival for Children 2006
Children's International Jury Prize, Cairo
International Film Festival for Children 2006
Best Short Fiction, Lamatatena Cine por Ninos et Ninas, Mexico, 2006
Best Short Family Film, Sarasota Film Festival 2006
Best Children's Film, Sun Valley Spiritual Film Festival 2006
Gold Statue, Best Direction, Roshd International Film Festival, Iran, 2006
Gold Statue, Best Script, Roshd International Film Festival, Iran, 2006
Gold Statue, Best Acting, Roshd International Film Festival, Iran, 2006
S-VOX (Vision TV)/ReelWorld Film Festival, Spiritual Film Award, 2007
Golden Minbar International Film Festival, Kazan, Russia, President of the Republic of Tartasan, Award for Humanity in Film Art, 2007

References

External links

 
 (archived)

American children's drama films
Canadian children's drama films
2005 films
2005 drama films
English-language Canadian films
2000s English-language films
2000s American films
2000s Canadian films